Life Hits is a 2006 Danish drama film directed by Christian E. Christiansen and starring Laura Christensen, Stephanie Leon, Julie Ølgaard, and Sara Møller Olsen. The film tells the story of four close friends who deal with the dramas of school life, partying, relationships, and bullying.

Cast and characters
 Laura Christensen as Christina
 Stephanie Leon as Cecilie
 Julie Ølgaard as Trine
 Sara Møller Olsen as Pernille
 Mette Riber Christoffersen as Anja
 Cyron Melville as Nikolaj
 Murad Mahmoud as Shaid

References

External links
 
 

2006 drama films
2006 films
Danish drama films
Films directed by Christian E. Christiansen
2006 directorial debut films
Films produced by Louise Vesth